Halsted Street, also known as Halsted Street/U.I.C., is a station on Metra's BNSF Line, located in Chicago, Illinois. As of 2018, Halsted Street is the 182nd busiest of Metra's 236 non-downtown stations, with an average of 115 weekday boardings. The elevated station consists of two island platforms on an embankment near an overpass. Only the northern island platform is actively used for passenger service. There are two unstaffed shelters on the northern platform, and staircases leading to the southbound sidewalk.

The station is served by 55 trains (27 inbound and 28 outbound) on weekdays.

Halsted Street is only served on weekdays.

Bus connections
CTA

 8 Halsted
 18 16th/18th
 N62 Archer (Owl Service - Overnight only)

References

External links 
 

Halsted Street entrance from Google Maps Street View

Metra stations in Chicago
Former Chicago, Burlington and Quincy Railroad stations